Mono is the eighth studio album by American country music band The Mavericks. It was released on February 17, 2015 via Valory Music Group. The album sold 8,000 copies in its first week of release, debuting at number 5 on the Billboard Top Country Albums chart. The album was recorded and mixed in monophonic sound.

Track listing

Chart performance

References

2015 albums
The Mavericks albums
Big Machine Records albums
Albums produced by Niko Bolas